Service de Luxe is a 1938 American comedy film directed by Rowland V. Lee and starring Constance Bennett, Vincent Price (in his film debut) and Charles Ruggles.

Plot
Helen Murphy, alias Dorothy Madison number 1 (Constance Bennett), runs a very successful agency, "Dorothy Madison Services," for wealthy people who need someone to run their lives. A huge staff is up 24 hours a day to attend to all sorts of problems. Her alter ego, Pearl, alias Dorothy Madison 2 (Helen Broderick), is there  to assist Murphy, who dreams of finding a man who is able to run his own life.

Robert Wade (Vincent Price), a young inventor from Albany, New York, leaves behind him five old aunts who tried to run his life. He comes to town to develop his tractor model. Murphy and Wade meet on the boat. Murphy is there on orders from Wade's uncle (Lionel Belmore), who is a client of Madison Services, but she picks the wrong man to send back home, while she meets Wade and is instantly fascinated by him, although he thinks she's not a career girl, as well as being rather helpless.

When she discovers that the man she met on the boat was Wade, she has some problems how to manage this relationship. Her client Mr. Robinson (Charles Ruggles) is willing to finance Wade's tractor model and arranges a laboratory for him. Unfortunately, his daughter Audrey (Joy Hodges) wants to marry Wade. While her father has adapted a kitchen in his library to be taught how to cook by Bibenko (Mischa Auer), Audrey tries to be in the basement laboratory with Wade. When it comes out that Bibenko is a Russian prince, Audrey finds he's the better husband-to-be. Wade marries Murphy, who leaves behind her career-girl life to become a wife.

Cast
 Constance Bennett as Helen Murphy  
 Vincent Price as Robert Wade 
 Charles Ruggles as Mr. Robinson 
 Helen Broderick as Pearl  
 Mischa Auer as Bibenko  
 Joy Hodges as Audrey Robinson
 Frances Robinson as Secretary  
 Halliwell Hobbes as Butler 
 Raymond Parker as Bellhop  
 Frank Coghlan Jr. as Bellhop  
 Lawrence Grant as Voroshinsky  
 Nina Gilbert as Mrs. Devereaux 
 Crauford Kent as Mr. Devereaux  
 Lionel Belmore as Robert Wade  (uncle)
 Chester Clute as Bridegroom 
 Ben Hall as Yokel

References

Bibliography
 Kellow, Brian. The Bennetts: An Acting Family. University Press of Kentucky, 2004.

External links

1938 films
American comedy films
1938 comedy films
Films directed by Rowland V. Lee
Universal Pictures films
American black-and-white films
1930s English-language films
1930s American films